The R334 is a Regional Route in the Nelson Mandela Bay Metropolitan Municipality of South Africa that connects the N2 west of Port Elizabeth to the N2 at Coega north of Port Elizabeth via Uitenhage. The middle section of the route is also designated as the M20 metropolitan route (labelled on road signage).

Route 
The R334 begins at a junction with the N2 National Route north-east of Port Elizabeth (7.5 km south-west of Colchester), heading west-south-west. It is initially co-signed with the R102 for 10 kilometres before the R334 becomes its own road westwards named Daniel Pienaar Street. It runs through the northern parts of Motherwell, where it forms a four-way-junction with the R335.

16 kilometres after the R335 junction, the R334 crosses the R75 to enter Uitenhage (Kariega). It reaches a t-junction with Graaff-Reinet Street, where the R334 becomes Graaff-Reinet Street southwards and enters the Uitenhage town centre. It meets the north-western origin of the M6 at the Caledon Street junction, where it becomes Caledon Street westwards before becoming Cuyler Street southwards and meeting the northern origin of the M10.

It leaves the town to the south-west, passing KwaNobuhle. It ends at a junction with the R102 to the west of Port Elizabeth (east of Van Stadens Wild Flower Reserve), near an interchange with the N2.

External links
 Routes Travel Info

References

Regional Routes in the Eastern Cape
Transport in Port Elizabeth
Nelson Mandela Bay Metropolitan Municipality